Castern Hall, also known as Casterne Hall, is a privately owned 18th-century country house in the Manifold Valley, near Ilam, Staffordshire, England.

History 
The grange at Castern was owned by Burton Abbey until the Dissolution of the Monasteries. It was acquired by Roger Hurt, youngest son of Nicholas Hurt of Ashbourne, who settled there in the mid-16th century. Later, Nicholas Hurt (1649-1711) married the heiress of Alderwasley and in time Alderwasley Hall became the family's principal residence.

The Castern house was remodeled in about 1740 by Nicholas Hurt, who became High Sheriff of Derbyshire in 1756. The present three-story, five-bayed entrance front in the Georgian style dates from this period.

In the 18th and 19th centuries, the house was often rented out to tenants. The Alderwasley estate was sold in the 1930s and Castern  became the family's principal residence once again before being sold again by the family.

The house was substantially featured in Agatha Christie's Poirot in the episode "The Mystery of Hunter's Lodge". Other movies and series that have been shot there were Jane Eyre (1983), Far from the Madding Crowd (1997) and Jonathan Creek: Frog Hollow. (1999)

See also
Grade II* listed buildings in Staffordshire Moorlands
Listed buildings in Ilam, Staffordshire

References

Grade II* listed buildings in Staffordshire
Historic house museums in Derbyshire